No Doors, No Windows is a 1975 short story collection by American author Harlan Ellison. It contains mostly suspense and crime tales along with a very long introduction by Ellison.

Contents
Introduction: "Blood/Thoughts"
"The Whimper of Whipped Dogs"
"Eddie, You're My Friend"
"Status Quo at Troyden's"
"Nedra at f:5.6"
"Opposites Attract"
"Toe the Line"
"Down in the Dark"
"Pride in the Profession"
"The Children's Hour"
"White Trash Don't Exist"
"Thicker Than Blood"
"Two Inches in Tomorrow's Column"
"Promises of Laughter" 
"Ormond Always Pays His Bills" 
"The Man on the Juice Wagon"
"Tired Old Man"

 

Short story collections by Harlan Ellison
1975 short story collections
Pyramid Books books